The 2008 NBL season was the 27th season of the National Basketball League. The Waikato Pistons won the championship in 2008 to claim their third league title.

Summary

Regular season standings

Playoff bracket

Awards

Player of the Week

Statistics leaders
Stats as of the end of the regular season

Regular season
 Most Valuable Player: Jason Crowe (Waikato Pistons)
 NZ Most Valuable Player: Casey Frank (Auckland Stars)
 Most Outstanding Guard: Jason Crowe (Waikato Pistons)
 Most Outstanding NZ Guard: Phill Jones (Nelson Giants)
 Most Outstanding Forward: Casey Frank (Auckland Stars)
 Most Outstanding NZ Forward/Centre: Casey Frank (Auckland Stars)
 Scoring Champion: Brian Wethers (Waikato Pistons)
 Rebounding Champion: Antoine Tisby (Otago Nuggets)
 Assist Champion: Jason Crowe (Waikato Pistons)
 Rookie of the Year: Tyrone Davey (Auckland Stars)
 Coach of the Year: Doug Marty (Wellington Saints)
 All-Star Five:
 G: Jason Crowe (Waikato Pistons)
 G: Brian Wethers (Waikato Pistons)
 F: Ernest Scott (Wellington Saints)
 F: Casey Frank (Auckland Stars)
 C: Nick Horvath (Wellington Saints)

Playoffs
 Finals MVP: Puke Lenden (Waikato Pistons)

References

External links
Basketball New Zealand 2008 Annual Report
Basketball New Zealand 2008 Results Annual
2008 NBL Round 15
2008 NBL Playoffs
2008 NBL Finals
NBL Finals Game 1 box score

National Basketball League (New Zealand) seasons
NBL